NRK Tegnspråk is a Norwegian television channel broadcasting signed versions of programs broadcast by NRK1, NRK2, NRK3, and NRK Super.

External links
NRK Tegnspråk

NRK
Television channels in Norway
Television channels and stations established in 2001
2001 establishments in Norway
Sign language television shows